Albion Center is a hamlet southwest of Altmar, in the town of Albion in Oswego County, New York, United States.

References

Hamlets in New York (state)
Hamlets in Oswego County, New York